The Amsterdam Admirals were a professional American football team based in Amsterdam, Netherlands, playing in the NFL Europe.

History
The Admirals were formed in 1995 as part of the NFL's plan to restart the World League of American Football, to be based entirely in Europe. The Admirals were one of three new teams, the others being the Scottish Claymores based in Edinburgh and the Rhein Fire based in Düsseldorf, Germany, to join the old World League's European Division teams: the Barcelona Dragons, the Frankfurt Galaxy, and the London Monarchs.

The Admirals began playing their home games at the old Olympisch Stadion, built in 1928 for the Summer Games. They played there for two years until the Amsterdam ArenA was completed in 1996. When the Admirals were forced to schedule their last home game of the 2000 season against the Claymores away from the ArenA as Euro 2000 preparations were finalized, they made a return to the Olympisch Stadion in what turned out to be one of the most unusual games in American football history. The end zone at the north end of the stadium was ruled unsafe by the officials as the surface was in poor condition, so it was decided that the teams would change ends at every change of possession and play towards the other end zone.

They qualified for the 1995 World Bowl with a 9–1 regular season record, but lost to the Frankfurt Galaxy by a score of 26–22. Ten years later, on their 11th year of existence, the Admirals won their first World Bowl by defeating the defending champion Berlin Thunder 27–21 in the championship game's 13th edition. The next season, they failed to defend their title against the Frankfurt Galaxy 22–7 in World Bowl XIV.

Under the "Player Continuity Program", the Admirals contracted linebacker Derrick Ballard and running back Jonathan Smith for the 2007 season.

Season-by-season

Head coaches

Attendance

Source: Kenn.com

Ring of Honor
 Mike Evans – DE (1995–1997)
 Adam Vinatieri – K (1995)
 Jonathan Kirksey – DT (1995, 1998–2001)
 Frank Temming – RB (1995–2000)
 Silvio Diliberto – K (1997–2004)
 Kurt Warner – QB (1998)
 Derrick Levake – OL (1999–2000)
 Rafael Cooper – RB (2002)

Notable players
 Mike Evans – DE (1995–1997)
 Jamie Martin – QB (1995)
 Brad Lebo – QB (1995)
 Darren Bennett – P (1995)
 Adam Vinatieri –K (1996)
 Will Furrer – QB (1995–1996)
 Mario Cristobal – OG (1995–1996)
 Jay Fiedler – QB (1997)
 Ta'ase Faumui – DE (1998)
 Kurt Warner – QB (1998)
 Jake Delhomme – QB (1998)
 Tom Nütten – OG (1998)
 Joe Douglass – WR (1998–1999)
 Dan Gonzalez – QB (1999)
 Jim Kubiak – QB (1999–2000)
 Ron Powlus – QB (2000)
 José Cortéz – K (2000)
 Francesco Biancamano – P/K (1999–2000)
 Spergon Wynn – QB (2001)
 Kevin Daft – QB (2002)
 Shaun Hill – QB (2003)
 Clint Stoerner – QB (2004)
 Gibran Hamdan – QB (2004–2006)
 Kurt Kittner – QB (2005)
 Jarrett Payton – RB (2005)
 Ruvell Martin – WR (2005)
 Cory Peoples – S (2005)
 Norman LeJeune – S (2005)
 Jeff Roehl – OL (2006)
 Jared Allen – QB (2006)
 Glenn Pakulak – P (2006–2007)
 Shawn Morgan – LB (2006)
 Derrick Ballard – LB (2005–2007) 2007 contract player
 Jonathan Smith – RB (2005 & 2007) 2007 contract player
 Chris Wing – DE/LB (1999)
 Carl-Johan Björk – LB (2005–2007)

League records (1995–2007)

Individual records
Note: NFLE had a 10-game season.

Team records

Source: NFLEurope.com

See also
Amsterdam Admirals 2006
Amsterdam Admirals 2007

External links

NFL Europa: Amsterdam Admirals

 
NFL Europe (WLAF) teams
Defunct American football teams in the Netherlands
1995 establishments in the Netherlands
2007 disestablishments in the Netherlands
Sports clubs in Amsterdam
American football teams established in 1995
American football teams disestablished in 2007